Bharjari Bete is a 1981 Indian Kannada-language Western action film directed by Rajendra Singh Babu, starring Ambareesh, Jayamala and Shankar Nag. The supporting cast features Dinesh, Tiger Prabhakar and Vajramuni.

Cast
 Ambareesh
 Shankar Nag
 Jayamala
 Swapna
 Tiger Prabhakar
 Pratima Devi
 Vajramuni
 Uma Shivakumar
 Rajanand
 Vasudeva Girimaji
 Tiptur Siddaramaiah
 Malur Sonnappa

Soundtrack

Ilayaraaja composed the music for the soundtracks with lyrics written by Chi. Udaya Shankar and R. N. Jayagopal.

References

External links
 

1980s Kannada-language films
1981 films
Films scored by Ilaiyaraaja
Films directed by Rajendra Singh Babu